Kurt Werner Lischka (16 August 1909 in Breslau (now Wrocław) – 16 May 1989 in Brühl) was an SS official, Gestapo chief and commandant of the Security police (Sicherheitspolizei; SiPo) and Security Service (Sicherheitsdienst; SD) in Paris during the German occupation of France in World War II.

Biography
Lischka was the son of a bank official. He studied law and political science in Breslau and Berlin. After obtaining his degree he worked in district courts and in the Provincial Court of Appeal in Breslau. Lischka joined the SS on 1 June 1933, reached the rank of SS major in 1938 and then SS lieutenant colonel on 20 April 1942. On 1 September 1935 Lischka joined the Gestapo and in January 1940 became head of the Gestapo in Cologne.

Lischka headed the operation that resulted in the incarceration of over 30,000 German Jews immediately following the mass destruction of Jewish property in the Kristallnacht pogrom of 9–10 November 1938.
As SiPo-SD chief of Paris, Lischka was responsible for the largest single mass deportation of Jews in Occupied France.

Capture and death
Lischka was captured and imprisoned in France in 1945, then extradited to Czechoslovakia in 1947 for war crimes but released on 22 August 1950. He settled in West Germany. Though a Paris court sentenced him in absentia to life imprisonment, Lischka lived out more than 25 years in freedom, working under his own name in the Federal Republic of Germany as, among other positions, a judge. 

As a result of the activities of French lawyer and Nazi hunter Serge Klarsfeld and his wife Beate Klarsfeld, Lischka was eventually arrested in Cologne. Lischka was sentenced to a ten-year prison term on 2 February 1980 alongside two other former Gestapo men: Herbert Hagen, personal assistant of SS police chief in Paris Carl Oberg sentenced to 12 years and Ernst Heinrichsohn, who worked in the Gestapo's "Jewish affairs" department in Paris, sentenced to six years. Following Lischka's early release on health grounds, he died in a nursing home on 16 May 1989 in Brühl.

References

Sources
 

1909 births
1989 deaths
Lawyers from Wrocław
SS-Obersturmbannführer
SS and Police Leaders
Holocaust perpetrators in Germany
Holocaust perpetrators in France
Gestapo personnel
People from the Province of Silesia
Reich Security Main Office personnel